Utkal Gourab Madhusudan Setu is a bridge connecting Cuttack and Athagarh. The bridge was opened to public on 01.04.2018. It is named after Madhusudan Das , famed lawyer, freedom fighter.

References

Bridges in Odisha
Bridges completed in 2018
Mahanadi River
Cuttack district
2018 establishments in Odisha